Nico Baracchi (April 19, 1957 – March 24, 2015) was a Swiss bobsledder and skeleton racer who competed from the early 1980s to the late 1990s. He won two silver medals at the FIBT World Championships with his first in skeleton at St. Moritz in 1982 and his second in bobsleigh's four-man event at Cortina d'Ampezzo in 1989. Baracchi died on March 24, 2015, at the age of 57 in his home of Celerina, Switzerland.

Barrachi's best finish in the Bobsleigh World Cup was third in 1988-9, both in the combined men's and two-man events.

When skeleton was reintroduced as a sport in 1989, Baracchi tried to regain his success in the early 1980s, but without much success. His best finish at the world championships after 1989 was 11th in the men's event at Igls in 1991.

References

External links
Bobsleigh four-man world championship medalists since 1930
FIBT men's skeleton results: 1928-2005 (link invalid as of December 6, 2007).
List of combined men's bobsleigh World Cup champions: 1985-2007
List of two-man bobsleigh World Cup champions since 1985
Skeletonsport.com profile

1957 births
2015 deaths
Swiss male bobsledders
Swiss male skeleton racers
20th-century Swiss people